The United States Air Force's Missile Combat Competition is a military competition that recognizes the intercontinental ballistic missile combat crews in the force.

History

Curtain raiser
The first missile combat competition, named CURTAIN RAISER, ran from 3–7 April 1967.

United States' Strategic Air Command began the event to allow differing intercontinental ballistic missile units to compete for the title of "Best ICBM Wing".

Olympic arena
While the second competition in 1968 was canceled, due to SAC commitments in Southeast Asia, the third competition was held on 19–23 May 1969.  The competition was also redesignated OLYMPIC ARENA.

Guardian Challenge

After the demise of the Cold War, the event was renamed Guardian Challenge and began to include space operations units, as well as ICBM organizations.

Global Strike Challenge
After the transfer of Intercontinental Ballistic Missiles (ICBM) from Air Force Space Command to Air Force Global Strike Command on 1 December 2009, Missile Combat Competition has been rolled up under a competition which will be known as Global Strike Challenge.  Global Strike Challenge is Air Force Global Strike Command's competition for Air Force ICBM and Bomber Forces.  The first Global Strike Challenge took place at Barksdale AFB LA in November 2010.

Blanchard Trophy

See also
Guardian Challenge
LGM-30 Minuteman
LGM-25C Titan II

References

United States Air Force